The year 2013 is the 12th year in the history of Cage Warriors, a mixed martial arts promotion based in the United Kingdom. In 2013 Cage Warriors held 14 events beginning with, Cage Warriors: 52.

Events list

Cage Warriors: 52

Cage Warriors: 52 was an event held on March 9, 2013 in London, England.

Results

References

Cage Warriors events
2013 in mixed martial arts